Marie Henrie Mackenzie (August 3, 1878 in Rotterdam – December 30, 1961 in Hilversum) was a Dutch painter.
He was a student of the Art School in Rotterdam and later on of the famous Dutch painter George Hendrik Breitner in Amsterdam.

Having made a career at an oil company, Mackenzie completely devoted himself after 1931 to painting. He then was at the age of 43 years. Mackenzie was a painter of landscapes, figures, portraits and harbour views. In addition, he is well known for his impressionist cityscapes of Amsterdam.

Mackenzie's work was included in the 1939 exhibition and sale Onze Kunst van Heden (Our Art of Today) at the Rijksmuseum in Amsterdam.

His work can be found in the Goois Museum, Hilversum and the Rijkscollectie (Governmental collection of the Netherlands).

References

1878 births
1961 deaths
Painters from Rotterdam
Willem de Kooning Academy alumni
20th-century Dutch painters